Akeno Air Field  is a military aerodrome of the Japan Ground Self-Defense Force.

JGSDF helicopter types based at Akeno include Bell AH-1S Cobra, Bell UH-1J Iroquois, Kawasaki OH-1, Kawasaki OH-6D, Kawasaki CH-47J/JA Chinook, Mitsubishi UH-60J and Emstron TH-480.

References

Airports in Japan
Transport in Mie Prefecture
Japan Ground Self-Defense Force bases
Buildings and structures in Mie Prefecture